Eskil District is a district of Aksaray Province of Turkey. Its seat is the town Eskil. Its area is 1,701 km2, and its population is 27,151 (2021).

Composition
There are two municipalities in Eskil District:
 Eskil
 Eşmekaya

There are 11 villages in Eskil District:

 Başaran
 Bayramdüğün
 Büğet
 Celil
 Çukuryurt
 Filikçi
 Gümüşdüğün
 Güneşli
 Katrancı
 Kökez
 Sağsak

References

Districts of Aksaray Province